Glenorchy Knights Football Club is an Australian association football club based in Glenorchy, Tasmania. Founded in 1957, the club competes in Australia's second-tier National Premier League, with matches played at KGV Park.

History
The club was founded in 1957 as Glenorchy Croatia, and experienced almost immediate success, winning the state title for the first time in 1963.  They experienced their best success in the 1970s, winning three titles, before having a league lull in the 1980s.  However, re-branded as the Glenorchy Knights, they have slowly established a new sense of self, culminating in winning the State Championship for the first time in 13 years in 2005, and narrowly missing out on back to back state titles by losing a penalty shoot-out to Somerset in 2006. In 2010, Glenorchy Knights finished in 3rd Position in the Forestry Tasmania Southern Premier League.

In 2012 Glenorchy Knights were accepted with a license to participate in a new Tasmanian statewide league NPL Tasmania between 2012 and 2015.

In 2015 Glenorchy Knights were unsuccessful in their application to remain within the NPL Tasmania and returned to lower Southern Championship in 2016. The 2015 season was particularly poor for the Knights' first grade side, who won just two games all season and finished with a -133 goal difference.

Glenorchy Knights responded by winning three consecutive Southern Championship's in 2016, 2017 and 2018, losing just three in 49 games.

Honours
State Championship: 7 times (1970, 1974, 1975, 1992, 1999, 2005, 2021)
State Championship Runners-up: 5 times (1978, 1980, 1998, 2006, 2020)
Southern Premierships: 10 times(1970, 1974, 1975, 2000, 2004, 2005, 2006, 2016, 2017, 2018)
Southern Premier Runners-up: (9 times) 1967, 1971, 1972, 1973, 1977, 1985, 1986, 1998, 2002
KO Cup Winners: (8 times) 1963, 1969, 1970, 1978, 2000, 2005, 2012, 2020
KO Cup Runners-up: (5 times) 1968, 1974, 2001, 2003, 2017
Summer Cup Winners: (5 times) 1979, 1982, 1983, 1993, 2003
Cadbury Charity Cup Winners: (once)1993
Cadbury Trophy Winners: (3 times) 1978, 1985, 1992
Falkinder and Association Cup Winners: (once)1964
Falkinder and Association Cup Runners-up: (5 times) 1962, 1963, 1966, 1970, 1973
Lloyd Triestino Cup Winners: (2 times) 1972, 1973

Seasons

See also
List of Croatian soccer clubs in Australia
Australian-Croatian Soccer Tournament
Croatian Australian

References

External links
Official club website

National Premier Leagues clubs
Soccer clubs in Tasmania
Croatian sports clubs in Australia
Association football clubs established in 1957
1957 establishments in Australia
Glenorchy, Tasmania
Sport in Hobart